Andre DeSean Wicker (born April 18, 1970), better known by his stage name Dresta (sometimes Gangsta Dresta), is an American rapper. He is best known for collaborating with Eazy-E on the 1993 single "Real Muthaphuckkin G's".

He is the older brother of rapper B.G. Knocc Out, who is also featured on the song. Together, they released their only studio album Real Brothas, in August 1995, which peaked at #128 on the Billboard 200. In 1996, the pair appeared on the remixed version of the South Central Cartel song, "Knock on Wood".

Early life
Andre Wicker was born and raised in Nutty Blocc in Compton, California. He and his brother Arlandis Hinton, also known as B.G. Knocc Out, became Nutty Blocc Compton Crips. He was convicted of assaulting another gang member in Compton in 1988, and was incarcerated at the California Youth Authority in Camarillo until 1993.

Music career
While Dresta was serving his five-year sentence, he started writing lyrics and rapping, gaining some notoriety. Within months of Dresta's release, he and B.G. Knocc Out signed to Eazy-E's Ruthless Records and made their debut on Eazy's 1993 multi-platinum EP It's On (Dr. Dre) 187um Killa on the single "Real Muthaphuckkin G's" (which was censored to "Real Compton City G's" in order to garner MTV and radio airplay). The song itself was a response to Dr. Dre and Snoop Dogg's various 'diss' records towards Eazy-E on Dr. Dre's debut album, The Chronic.

In 1995, Dresta and B.G. Knocc Out released their debut studio album Real Brothas, which remains their only album to date. At the end of the same year, they made three guest appearances in Eazy-E's posthumous album Str8 off tha Streetz of Muthaphukkin Compton.

After B.G. Knocc Out's incarceration in 1998, Dresta worked with Death Row Records and appeared on two tracks from Death Row's Too Gangsta for Radio compilation, but never actually signed to the record label.

Dresta stated in an interview that he is currently working on Dirty West mixtape series and on upcoming solo album, hinting possibility of Real Brothas to get re-released. Dresta also wrote a song for Dr. Dre's album Detox, but Dre didn't want to collaborate with him. He criticized Dr. Dre for surrounding himself with mediocre artists and the numerous delays of his Detox album.

Personal life

1994 shooting
On January 14, 1994, Tyrone Thomas (also known as Tony Bogard), Andre Wicker and Rodney Compton were involved in a gang confrontation in Imperial Courts housing projects. Thomas and Compton were former PeeJay Watts Crips and Thomas had helped to organize a truce between Crips and Bloods in Watts, Los Angeles in 1992.

At around 6:30 p.m., a shooting began in a parking lot in the 2200 block of East 114th Street. 25 shots were fired, six of which hit Thomas, who was said to be the prime target of the shooting. According to witnesses, Thomas was carrying a pistol and he shot back at the assailants, possibly wounding two of them.

Thomas and Wicker were subsequently hospitalized in Martin Luther King, Jr. Multi-Service Ambulatory Care Center, where Thomas was pronounced dead. Wicker was in critical condition while arriving to the hospital, but received a surgery for a gunshot to his left arm and was released the same week. Compton was wounded in the arm and treated at St. Francis Medical Center in Lynwood. He was later charged with the murder of Thomas, but was released from jail after pleading no contest to one count of voluntary manslaughter on May 31, 1994. Wicker was sentenced to one year probation under terms of a plea bargain.

Discography

Collaboration albums
Real Brothas with B.G. Knocc Out (1995)

Guest appearances

References

External links
Discography at Discogs
2008 interview of Dresta

1971 births
Living people
African-American male rappers
American people convicted of assault
American shooting survivors
Crips
Def Jam Recordings artists
G-funk artists
Gangsta rappers
Musicians from Compton, California
Rappers from Los Angeles
Ruthless Records artists
Underground rappers
21st-century American rappers
21st-century American male musicians
21st-century African-American musicians
20th-century African-American people